The 2011–12 Amkar Perm season was their 8th season in the Russian Premier League, the highest tier of association football in Russia, following promotion during the 2003 season.

Squad

Out on loan

Transfers

Winter 2010-11

In:

Out:

Summer 2011

In:

Out:

Winter 2011–12

In:

Out:

Competitions

Russian Premier League

Matches

League table

Russian Premier League — Relegation Group

Matches

League table

Russian Cup

2010-11

2011-12

Squad statistics

Appearances and goals

|-
|colspan="14"|Players who left Amkar Perm on loan:

|-
|colspan="14"|Players who left Amkar Perm during the season:

|}

Goal Scorers

Disciplinary record

References

FC Amkar Perm seasons
Amkar Perm